Ladislaus Chernac (1742–1816) was a Hungarian scientist who moved to Deventer in the Netherlands. He is the author of the first published table giving decompositions in prime factors up to one million.

Biography

László Csernák was born in Hungary in 1742. He went to school in Debrecen, and then continued to study in Vienna, Basel, and Turin. He eventually went to the Netherlands.

Works

 Ladislaus Chernac: Cribrum arithmeticum, 1811, http://gdz.sub.uni-goettingen.de/dms/load/img/?PPN=PPN591322250

External links
 The site http://locomat.loria.fr contains a reconstruction of Chernac's Cribrum arithmeticum.

1742 births
1816 deaths
18th-century Hungarian mathematicians
19th-century Hungarian mathematicians